Ágis tragédiája is a Hungarian drama play, written by György Bessenyei. It was first produced in 1772.

Information 

 www.theeuropeanlibrary.org
 www.arcanum.hu/hu/online-kiadvanyok

Hungarian plays
1772 plays